Odyssey is the fourth studio album by guitarist Yngwie Malmsteen, released on 8 April 1988 through Polydor Records. The album reached No. 40 on the US Billboard 200 and remained on that chart for eighteen weeks, as well as reaching the top 50 in five other countries. As of 2021 it remains Malmsteen's highest-charting release on the Billboard 200.

Critical reception

Steve Huey at AllMusic gave Odyssey two stars out of five, calling it "a more subdued, polished collection seemingly designed for mainstream radio airplay", but that it "shows little difference in approach from [Malmsteen's] previous output". He praised Joe Lynn Turner's vocals and Malmsteen's guitar work, but remarked that the latter sounds "constrained and passionless" due in part to his recovery from a near-fatal car accident in 1987.

Track listing

Personnel
Yngwie Malmsteen – guitar, Moog Taurus, bass (tracks 3–7, 10–12), arrangement, producer
Joe Lynn Turner – vocals
Jens Johansson – keyboard
Anders Johansson – drums
Bob Daisley – bass (tracks 1, 2, 8, 9)
Jeff Glixman – engineer, producer
John Rolio – engineer
Scott Gordon – assistant engineer, assistant mixing engineer
Steve Thompson – mixing
Michael Barbiero – mixing
George Cowan – assistant mixing engineer
Jim Lewis – executive producer

Charts

Weekly charts

Certifications

References

External links
Odyssey, 1988 at yngwiemalmsteen.com
In Review: Yngwie J. Malmsteen "Odyssey" at Guitar Nine Records

Yngwie Malmsteen albums
1988 albums
Polydor Records albums
Albums produced by Jeff Glixman